Pedro Koechlin von Stein is a Peruvian politician and entrepreneur. He was With Force Peru's presidential candidate for the 2006 national election. He received 0.3% of the vote, coming in 11th place.

His politics is centered on environment-friendly policies in a so-called "Blue Proposal".

He is the majority owner of airline Wayra Peru. He was expelled from the country in 1971 by General Juan Velasco's government, after organizing a Carlos Santana concert at the University of San Marcos, in the first "mega-concert" in Latin America.

References

External links
 Con Fuerza Perú's website
 Party's weblog
 Blue Proposal

Peruvian people of German descent
Living people
With Force Peru politicians
Candidates for President of Peru
Year of birth missing (living people)